The Battle of Kaidanowo was fought on Sunday, 15 November 1812, near the village of Kaidanava, part of the Russian Empire at the time. A Lithuanian, Württembergian, and French force under General  of 1,300-2,000 was defeated by seasoned Russian forces led by General Charles de Lambert of about 3,800-4,000.

Background
On one side was General Kossecki's division, which was mauled two days ago at Nowo Schwerschen, which was reinforced after the battle with Württembergian infantry and French cavalry units. On the other side was cavalry from the Army of the Danube.

Order of Battle 
According to Pugačiauskas, the regiments under Kossecki were:

 incompletely formed 22nd Lithuanian Infantry Regiment (1,500)
 18th Lithuanian Uhlan Regiment (940)
 Kossakowski's Chasseurs à pied Regiment (two battalions, total 634)

Battle 
Lambert mounted a pursuit, catching them at Kaidanowo, where he destroyed most of the detachment. 

The Russian cavalry charge proved devastating, as the unseasoned 22nd Lithuanian Infantry Regiment did not withstand it and retreated. The regiment's commander, Stanisław Czapski, tried to halt the retreat and even shot insubordinate soldiers, but his actions were unable to rectify the situation. All three Lithuanian regiments suffered losses.

Kossecki and about 100 of his cavalry escaped back to Minsk.

Aftermath 
Of the 22nd Lithuanian Infantry Regiment, a mere 30 officers and 53 soldiers remained. Stanisław Czapski was awarded the Legion of Honour by Napoleon due to his effort in this battle.

The 18th Lithuanian Uhlan Regiment survived this battle, which was its first, relatively unscathed, as it managed to evade Russian capture and retreated towards Berezina.

Bronikowski and about 1,000 men evacuated Minsk and, including about 500 men of the 7th Württembergian Infantry Regiment, marched to Barysaw. A number of civilians of the administration together with many soldiers escaped to Vilnius, where they caused a panic because the inhabitants thought that the Russians were following them.

See also
List of battles of the French invasion of Russia

References

Sources

External links
 

Battles of the French invasion of Russia
Battles of the Napoleonic Wars
Battles involving France
Battles involving Russia
Conflicts in 1812
November 1812 events
19th century in the Russian Empire
1812 in the Russian Empire